The Karachi Kings is a franchise cricket team that represents Karachi, Sindh, Pakistan in the Pakistan Super League (PSL). The team was coached by Herschelle Gibbs and captained by Imad Wasim. The team won their maiden PSL title in 2020, which make them the defending champion in 2021.

Teams standings

Points table

League fixtures

Playoffs

Eliminator

Eliminator 1

References 

2021 Pakistan Super League
Kings in 2021
2021